Bramma  is a 1991 Indian Tamil language crime thriller film directed by K. Subash and produced by M. Ramanathan. The film stars Sathyaraj, Khushbu and Bhanupriya. Goundamani, Vijayakumar, Pradeep Shakthi, and C. R. Saraswathi play supporting roles. It was released on 5 November 1991. The film was remade in Kannada as Ravivarma (1992) and in Hindi by the same director as Brahma (1994).

Plot 
Ravivarman is a talented artist with a special ability to draw faces of people at different ages given their childhood photo. After the tragic loss of his wife Pavithra in a flight blast, he became a drunkard and lived aimlessly. Police summons Ravi to draw the face of accused in bomb blast from the previous file photo. Because of his painting, the criminal George is caught by the police, and George challenges to take revenge on Ravi. Due to his help to the police, Ravi becomes famous and is called by a rich man in Rosewood Estate who wants to find his niece who went missing at the age of five. From the housemaid's warning, Ravi understands the rich man's true intentions. He draws his wife as the missing niece's painting and hands over it to the rich man. Meanwhile, he searches and finds Jennifer, who is the actual heir of Rosewood Estate. George escapes from jail, and it is revealed that Pavithra is alive but in a coma. Meanwhile, Jeni falls in love with Ravi. At last, Ravi fights and gets the property of Jeni and unites with Pavithra.

Cast 
Sathyaraj as Ravivarman
Khushbu as Jennifer
Bhanupriya as Pavithra
Goundamani as Valayapalayam Chinnasamy
Vijayakumar
Pradeep Shakthi
C. K. Saraswathi as Housemaid

Soundtrack 
The music composed by Ilaiyaraaja.

Critical reception 
The Indian Express wrote, "Its an elaborately worked out formula film, with ample opportunity for Sathyaraj to swagger around in his informal manner". Sundarji of Kalki wrote that the screenplay was filled with twists, but wondered if such a film needed some kind of thrill and horror, and they could not find it anywhere in the film.

References

External links 
 

1990s crime thriller films
1990s Tamil-language films
1991 films
Films directed by K. Subash
Films scored by Ilaiyaraaja
Indian crime thriller films
Tamil films remade in other languages